Cyril Francis Hemingway was an English footballer who played in the Football League for Exeter City, Rotherham United, Torquay United and Wolverhampton Wanderers.

References

English footballers
Association football forwards
English Football League players
Rotherham United F.C. players
Torquay United F.C. players
Exeter City F.C. players
Wolverhampton Wanderers F.C. players
Dartmouth A.F.C. players

Year of birth missing
Year of death missing